Allan John Foster (4 September 1925 – 15 January 1987) was an Australian politician

He was born in Scottsdale. In 1969 he was elected to the Tasmanian House of Assembly as a Labor member for Bass. He was appointed a minister in 1972, but resigned in 1974 after being involved in a car accident. He retired from politics in 1976.

References

1925 births
1987 deaths
Members of the Tasmanian House of Assembly
Australian Labor Party members of the Parliament of Tasmania
20th-century Australian politicians